Edward VII Battery was an artillery battery in the British Overseas Territory of Gibraltar.

Description
At the end of the nineteenth century Edward VII Battery had two  guns which were part of fourteen available for long range bombardment. These guns could fire across the Straits of Gibraltar including hitting shipping on the coast of Morocco.

References

Batteries in Gibraltar